Seokpo-myeon (Hangeul: 석포면, Hanja: 石浦面) is a myeon or a township in Bonghwa county of North Gyeongsang province in South Korea. The total area of Seokpo-myeon is 150.1 square kilometers, and, as of 2006, the population was 2,144 people. Seokpo-myeon is further divided into three "ri", or small villages.

Seokpo-myeon is the southernmost breeding habitat of the branchymystax lenok, a rare freshwater fish. Due to this, the breeding grounds in Seokpo-myeon were designated as Korean Natural Monument No. 74.

Administrative divisions
Seokpo-ri (석포리)
Daehyeon-ri (대현리)
Seungbu-ri (승부리)

Schools
Seokpo Elementary School (석포초등학교) in Seokpo-ri with a branch facility in Daehyeon-ri.
Seokpo Middle School (석포중학교) in Seokpo-ri.

References

External links 
 Seokpo-myeon Office Homepage
 Tourist Map of Bonghwa county including Seokpo-myeon

Bonghwa County
Towns and townships in North Gyeongsang Province